The 18th Senate District of Wisconsin is one of 33 districts in the Wisconsin State Senate.  Located in east-central Wisconsin, the district comprises most of Fond du Lac County and the southern half of Winnebago County, as well as the city of Waupun, which crosses into northern Dodge County.  The district also includes the cities of Fond du Lac and Oshkosh, and covers the south and west shores of Lake Winnebago.

Current elected officials
Dan Feyen is the senator representing the 18th district. He was first elected to the Senate in the 2016 general election and is now in his second four-year term.

Each Wisconsin State Senate district is composed of three Wisconsin State Assembly districts.  The 18th Senate district comprises the 52nd, 53rd, and 54th Assembly districts.  The current representatives of those districts are: 
 Assembly District 52: Jerry L. O'Connor (R–Fond du Lac)
 Assembly District 53: Michael Schraa (R–Oshkosh)
 Assembly District 54: Lori Palmeri (D–Oshkosh)

The district is located entirely within Wisconsin's 6th congressional district, which is represented by U.S. Representative Glenn Grothman.

Past senators
The district has previously been represented by:

Note: the boundaries of districts have changed repeatedly over history. Previous politicians of a specific numbered district have represented a completely different geographic area, due to redistricting. Prior to 1852, the 18th District was a Milwaukee-area district.

References

External links
District Website
Senator Gudex's Website

Wisconsin State Senate districts
Fond du Lac County, Wisconsin
Dodge County, Wisconsin
Winnebago County, Wisconsin
1848 establishments in Wisconsin